The Secret of Convict Lake is a 1951 American Western film directed by Michael Gordon and starring Glenn Ford, Gene Tierney, Ethel Barrymore and Zachary Scott. The film was a critical and commercial success. The story is fiction, based on legends of Convict Lake, located in the Sierra Nevada mountain ranges of northern California. and a short story by Anna Hunger and Jack Pollexfen. The film is the final role for Ann Dvorak before her retirement from the screen.

Plot
The film opens with the narrator (Dale Robertson in an early, uncredited role) laying the foundation of the story.

In 1871, six convicts escape from a Carson City prison. One of them freezes to death during a blizzard. The others—Canfield, Greer, Cockerell, Anderson and Maxwell—make it to Lake Monte Diablo, where eight women live in a settlement while their men are away prospecting. Granny is the elder, watching over Marcia, Rachel, Barbara, Susan, Harriet, Mary, and Millie.

Frightened, the women reluctantly permit them to use an empty cabin. Granny hides all the guns except one when they realize that the men are escaped convicts. Canfield has returned here for a reason; the other convicts think that he has money hidden somewhere nearby. Canfield was convicted of killing a mine owner, and $40,000 is missing.

Canfield learns that Marcia, to whom he is attracted, is engaged to be married to a man named Rudy Schaeffer. Canfield claims Rudy took the $40,000 and committed perjury to get Canfield convicted and sentenced to hang. Canfield reveals that he has returned to kill Schaeffer.

A barn catches fire due to Rachel's nervousness. After the convicts rescue the animals, the women treat them more kindly. Canfield is trustworthy, but the other four continue plotting.

Later, Canfield manages to take Granny's gun. Marcia rides off, so Canfield follows and catches up to her. They eventually embrace and kiss. He tells her that Morgan, a mine owner, had swindled him out of the money. When he  came to talk to Morgan about it, Morgan pulled a gun on him, they scuffled and the gun went off, killing Morgan. Schaeffer witnessed this, but claimed that Canfield had killed Morgan in cold blood, so Schaeffer could keep the money himself.

While they are away, Johnny Greer charms Rachel, Schaeffer's sister, into revealing where Granny hid the other guns. He, Cockerell and Anderson arm themselves and wait for Canfield.
 
On the way home, the men of the town stop in a saloon. Rudy Schaeffer spots a wanted poster, so the alarmed men race back to their families.
 
Clyde Maxwell, the youngest convict, a psychotic, cannot control his murderous impulses whenever someone resists him. He takes Barbara on a long walk and tries to kiss her. Barbara tries to pull away and he pulls out a machete. Canfield, riding back with Marcia, hears Barbara's cries and arrives in time to intervene. In the ensuing struggle, Maxwell stabs Canfield in the shoulder. Maxwell chases after Barbara, but the other women, who are out looking for her, kill him with a pitchfork. Greer has no trouble taking the wounded Canfield's gun.

Rachel finds the $40,000 in a trunk belonging to her brother, Rudy. She gives it to Marcia to give it to the men to leave. Marcia gives it to Greer to get him to stop beating Canfield.

Schaeffer and his men arrive back in the small town and confront the convicts. In a gunfight, Cockerell and Anderson are shot. Greer flees up the mountain, chased by all but Schaeffer. Greer drops the $40,000. He tries to pick it up, is shot, and falls to his death. Schaeffer goes for the stolen money. Canfield comes up behind him and at gunpoint, telling Schaeffer to confess. Marcia runs up behind screaming. As Canfield half turns to her, Schaeffer spins around and draws his gun and waits for Canfield to shoot him.

The sheriff and his posse arrive. When he asks about the five fugitives (they found the frozen sixth man earlier), Granny shows him five newly-dug graves (the 4 convicts and Schaeffer). The others, including a somber Rachel (despite the death of her brother), go along, and the sheriff is satisfied.

The narrator claims the story is true and reveals the lake was renamed Convict Lake.

Cast
 Glenn Ford as Jim Canfield
 Gene Tierney as Marcia Stoddard
 Ethel Barrymore as Granny
 Zachary Scott as Johnny Greer
 Ann Dvorak as Rachel Shaeffer
 Barbara Bates as Barbara Purcell
 Cyril Cusack as Edward 'Limey' Cockerell
 Richard Hylton as Clyde Maxwell
 Helen Westcott as Susan Haggerty
 Jeanette Nolan as Harriet Purcell
 Ruth Donnelly as Mary Fancher
 Harry Benjamin Carter as Rudy Schaeffer

References

External links
 
 
 
 

1951 films
1951 Western (genre) films
American black-and-white films
American Western (genre) films
Films directed by Michael Gordon
Films shot in Colorado
20th Century Fox films
Films scored by Sol Kaplan
1950s English-language films
1950s American films